The Lola T150, and it's the deriatives, the T152 and T153, were open-wheel racing car chassis, designed and built by Lola Cars to compete in USAC IndyCar racing series, between 1968 and 1970. The T150 and T153 were powered by the   Ford Indy V-8 turbo engine; while the T152 chassis used a   Offenhauser 4-cylinder turbo engine. Both the T150 and T152 used a unique four-wheel-drive system, which would be banned after the 1969 season. The T153 only used a conventional two-wheel-drive (rear-wheel-drive setup. The different chassis would, over the span of three years, win a total of 9 races, all while being driven by Al Unser.

References 

Open wheel racing cars
American Championship racing cars
Lola racing cars